Resistiré ("I'll Resist") may refer to:

Resistiré (Argentine TV series), 2003 Argentine telenovela
Resistiré (Chilean TV series), a Chilean reality television series
"Resistiré" (Dúo Dinámico song), 1988
"Resistiré" (Erreway song), 2003